The 11th LG Cup professional Go tournament was held in 2006 and 2007 and was won by Zhou Junxun. It featured:
 13 players from  South Korea - Cho Han-seung, Cho Hun-hyun, Choi Cheol-han, Choi Myung-hoon, Hong Min-pyo, Jin Siyoung, Kim Dong-hee, Ko Geuntae, Lee Chang-ho, Lee Se-dol, Park Seung-hyun, Park Yeong-hun, Yun Jun-sang
 11 players from  People's Republic of China - Chang Hao, Chen Yaoye, Ding Wei, Gu Li, Hu Yaoyu, Huang Yizhong, Wang Lei, Wang Xi, Xie He, Yu Bin, Zhou Heyang
 6 players from  Japan - Cho Chikun, Ko Iso, Kono Rin, So Yokoku, Takao Shinji, Yamashita Keigo
 2 players from  Taiwan - Lin Zhihan, Zhou Junxun

Two of the 30 players were given automatic berths: Gu Li, who won the 10th LG Cup, and runner up for the 10th LG Cup, Chen Yaoye.

Tournament

Finals 

Key
 W+R - White won by resignation
 B+0.5 - Black won by 0.5 points

LG Cup (Go)
2007 in go